Spinner is an instrumental album by British musicians Brian Eno and Jah Wobble (a.k.a. John Wardle), released in 1995.

Track listing 
All initial compositions by Brian Eno; tracks 2, 3, 5, 6, 9 and 10 with additional credit to Jah Wobble.
 "Where We Lived" – 2:59
 "Like Organza" – 2:44
 "Steam" – 3:16
 "Garden Recalled" – 3:21
 "Marine Radio" – 5:04
 "Unusual Balance" – 5:23
 "Space Diary 1" – 1:51
 "Spinner" – 2:54
 "Transmitter and Trumpet" – 8:41
 "Left Where It Fell" – 7:02
 (Hidden track later released on The Drop as "Iced World") – 8:42

Overview
The music on Spinner has its origins in the Eno-penned soundtrack to the Derek Jarman biographical 60-minute movie Glitterbug, which was released in 1994, shortly after Jarman's death.

The movie was an abstract montage composed of Super-8 excerpts from his personal video-diaries, going behind-the-scenes of many of his movies from the late sixties right up to the end of the eighties.

Eno composed most of the soundtrack in his Kilburn studio, working directly onto digital stereo. The music stayed in the film; it was never released as a separate entity. Eno explains "I had intended to collect the music as a soundtrack record, but in the end a lot of it didn't make much sense without the film".

In 1995, Eno handed the master-tapes to Wobble. "He received from me a number of stereo tapes and did what he does – spanning the gamut from leaving them completely alone (such as "Garden Recalled"); playing along (such as "Like Organza"); or using them as atmospheres for entirely new compositions (such as "Steam")".

Eno did not participate in any co-production on Spinner at all; it was all done by Wobble. Eno said "I didn't even hear it all till it was finished. I had no input at all on that stage of it. Everything that he put on, he produced. Anything you hear looming around in the back is probably what I produced".

Some of Eno's thoughts on the album in its final stages can be found in the last section ("Wobbly letter") of the appendix of Eno's published diary, A Year with Swollen Appendices. This section is a copy of a letter from Eno to Dominic Norman-Taylor of All Saints Records, describing Eno's opinions of Jah Wobble's mixes and treatments of the tracks. Several of the tracks are given their working titles ("Unusual Balance", for example, is referred to as "Scrapy"). The letter gives hints as to the methods used by Eno and Wobble in creating the album, with Eno providing many of the original tracks, which Wobble then treated and sequenced.

The finished product is a fusion of ambient, instrumental rock, and dub. Eno referred to the last track as an example of what he called "Unwelcome Jazz. Because for the last 3 or 4 years, really, I've been writing these pieces of music, which sound like some peculiar take on jazz. They don't really sound like jazz, they obviously have some kind of influence from jazz. But most of the people I played them to don't really like them – so I call it 'Unwelcome Jazz' [laughs]".

Personnel
Credits taken from album booklet.
 Brian Eno - synthesizer, treatments
 Jah Wobble - bass (on all tracks except 1, 4, 7), drums (tracks 3, 6, 10), keyboards (5, 9, 10), atmospheres (8, 9)
 Mark Ferda - atmospheres (3, 8-10), keyboards (3), percussion (10)
 Justin Adams - guitar (3, 6, 9)
 Richard Bailey - drums (5)
 Jaki Liebezeit - drums (8, 9)
 Sussan Deihim - vocals (6)

Production
 Brian Eno - initial soundtrack recording and production
 Jah Wobble and Mark Ferda - additional recording and mixing, final production
 Mark Ferda - mixing, assistant recording and production
 Brian Eno and David Coppenhall - cover art

Versions

Anthologies
 Sonora Portraits 1, a compilation CD accompanying a book of essays and interviews edited by Claudio Chianura & Giampiero Bigazzi, features the track "Left Where It Fell", as well as a few selections from Glitterbug (Materiali Sonori, MASO CD 90110, 1999).
 The tracks "Spinner" and "Left Where It Fell" appear on Jah Wobble's 2004 anthology I Could Have Been a Contender.

References

External links
 Interview; The Wire, Issue 139, Sep 1995
 Profile; Future Music, Issue 38, Dec 1995
 Interview; jazzthetik magazine, Nov/Dec 1996
 Beep discography entry
 ConnolyCo discography entry
 Discogs.com entries : 5, 6, 7.
 ProgArchives review 
 Rolling Stone review.
 All Saints entry.
 Jah Wobble's homepage
 Glitterbug IMDB entry

Brian Eno albums
Jah Wobble albums
Film soundtracks
Collaborative albums
1995 soundtrack albums
All Saints Records albums